Joseph Stebbins Lyman (February 14, 1785 – March 21, 1821) was a U.S. Representative from New York.

Born in Northfield, Massachusetts, Lyman attended the common schools. He was graduated from Dartmouth College, Hanover, New Hampshire, in 1806. He then studied law and was admitted to the bar and commenced practice in Cooperstown, New York. Lyman was elected as a Democratic-Republican to the Sixteenth Congress (March 4, 1819 – March 3, 1821). He was not a candidate for renomination in 1821. He died in Cooperstown, March 21, 1821. He was interred in Greenfield, Massachusetts.

Sources

1785 births
1821 deaths
Dartmouth College alumni
People from Northfield, Massachusetts
People from Cooperstown, New York
Democratic-Republican Party members of the United States House of Representatives from New York (state)
19th-century American politicians